Koninkrijksdag (
West Frisian: Keninkryksdei) is the commemoration of the signing of the Charter for the Kingdom of the Netherlands on 15 December 1954 in Aruba, Curaçao, the Netherlands, and Sint Maarten. When 15 December falls on a Sunday, the commemoration takes place on Monday 16 December. Kingdom Day is, unlike Koningsdag, not an official national holiday, but government buildings are instructed to fly the flag of the Netherlands.

The charter was signed by Queen Juliana on 15 December 1954. The charter deals with the relation between the Netherlands and the overseas territories, the Netherlands Antilles, Netherlands New Guinea and Suriname. As of 2010, the charter governs the relationships between the Netherlands, Aruba (since 1986), Curaçao and Sint Maarten (since 2010).

Since 2005, the Koninkrijksconcert is annually held on 15 December, to celebrate the relationship between Netherlands, the Netherlands Antilles, and Aruba. At the concerts, that were held in respectively Dordrecht, Amersfoort, Nijmegen, and Curaçao, musical artists from all over the kingdom have performed.

In 2008, Naturalisatiedag in the Kingdom of the Netherlands was moved from 24 August, the day on which the Constitution of the Netherlands was signed, to 15 December, which has a symbolic meaning for all constituent countries of the kingdom. On Naturalisation Day, newly naturalized citizens officially receive their Dutch citizenship.

References

Dutch monarchy
Public holidays in the Netherlands
December observances